Cheloctonus is a genus of scorpions in the family Hormuridae. Scorpions in this genus are not believed to be medically significant.

Species 
 Cheloctonus anthracinus Pocock, 1899
 Cheloctonus crassimanus (Pocock, 1896)
 Cheloctonus glaber Kraepelin, 1896
 Cheloctonus intermedius Hewitt, 1912
 Cheloctonus jonesii Pocock, 1892

References

Scorpion genera
Hormuridae
Scorpions